Subliminal Simulation is the second studio album by Canadian hip hop group Dream Warriors, released in 1994 in Canada and worldwide in 1995, on EMI/Pendulum Records. The original duo, King Lou and Capital Q, expanded to include Spek and DJ Luv (Michie Mee's former DJ).

Background
Following their well-received debut album, And Now the Legacy Begins, Dream Warriors' second effort featured appearances by Guru and DJ Premier of Gang Starr and Butterfly of Digable Planets. The collaboration "I've Lost My Ignorance" was originally released as a 12" single in 1991, though the album version has a different beat. Continuing the jazz rap trend, spoken word is performed during the interludes. The first single, "Day in Day Out", showcased the newest MC, Spek. The second single was "California Dreamin'".

Reception

The album received generally mixed reviews from music critics. RapReviews.com gave it a 9/10 rating, stating "Dream Warriors successfully recreate the night-at-the-jazz-club feel championed by The Roots and classic Tribe," also praising it as "A landmark in Canadian hip-hop and hell, hip-hop in general." The Source gave the album 3 out of 5 mics, calling it "a positive and ambitious LP." AllMusic gave it 2 out of 5 stars, noting that "Dream Warriors' jazz-rap formula has run out of steam." The album was nominated for Best Rap Recording at the 1995 Juno Awards.

Track listing

Samples
"Are We There Yet" – Contains a sample of "Elevation" by Pharoah Sanders
"Day in Day Out" – Contains a sample of "All the Way Lover" by Millie Jackson
"I've Lost My Ignorance" – Contains a sample of "Blackjack" by Donald Byrd and "Down By The River" by Buddy Miles
"California Dreamin'" – Contains samples of "Go on and Cry" by Les McCann and "La Di Da Di" by Doug E. Fresh and Slick Rick
"Break the Stereo" – Contains a sample of "Funky" by The Chambers Brothers
"Tricycles and Kittens" – Contains samples of "Another Opus" by Lem Winchester and "Zimba Ku" by Black Heat

Release history

Personnel

Alfio Annibalini – Assistant Engineer  
Beans – Producer  
Tim Bran – Engineer, Mixing  
Derek Brin – Programming, Producer, Engineer, Mixing  
Billy Bryans – Producer  
Butterfly – Remixing, Assistant Producer   
Tom Coyne – Mastering  
DJ Premier – Producer, Mixing  
Dream Warriors – Producer, Mixing  
G-Spot – Engineer  
Gang Starr – Vocals, Producer  
Tom Garneau – Assistant Engineer

Rupert Gayle – Executive Producer  
Bruce Grant – Engineer, Mixing  
Huge Voodoo – Producer  
Orin Isaacs – Bass, Engineer  
Black Katt – Poetry, Producer  
Dennis Kelly – Engineer, Mixing  
NinetyNine – Poetry, Producer  
Eddie Sancho – Engineer  
Walter Sobczak – Producer, Engineer, Mixing  
Max Vargas – Engineer  
David Williams – Keyboards

References

1994 albums
Albums produced by DJ Premier
Albums produced by Guru
Dream Warriors albums
EMI Records albums